Lacey M Wallace   is an archaeologist and Senior Lecturer in Roman History and Material Culture at the University of Lincoln.

Biography
Wallace complete undergraduate studies at Boston University in 2004 before attending Queens' College, Cambridge to complete her PhD in archaeology in 2011. She worked as a research associate in Roman archaeology at Cambridge (2013-2016) before joining the University of Lincoln in 2016.  Wallace was elected as a fellow of the Society of Antiquaries of London on 26 June 2021.

Select publications
Gardner, Andrew and Wallace, Lacey. 2020. "Making space for past futures: rural landscape temporalities in Roman Britain". Cambridge Archaeological Journal, 30 (2), 327–342. 
Wallace, Lacey and Mullen, Alex. 2019. "Landscape, Monumentality, and Expression of Group identities in Iron Age and Roman east Kent", Britannia, 1-34. 
Weekes, Jake, Watson, Sadie, Wallace, Lacey, Mazzilli, Francesca, Gardner, Andrew and Alberti, Marta. 2019. "Alienation and Redemption: the praxis of (Roman) archaeology in Britain". Theoretical Roman Archaeology Journal, 2 (1), 1–17. 
Wallace, Lacey. 2018. "Community and the creation of provincial identities: a re-interpretation of the aisled building at North Warnborough", The Archaeological Journal, 175 (2), 231–254.
Dobinson, Colin, Ferraby, Rose, Lucas, Jason, Millett, Martin and Wallace, Lacey. 2018. "Archaeological Field Survey in the Environs of Aldborough (Isurium Brigantum)". Yorkshire Archaeological Journal 90, 29–58. 
Wallace, Lacey, Mullen, Alex, Johnson, Paul and Verdonck, Lieven. 2016. "Archaeological Investigations at Bourne Park, Bishopsbourne, 2011-2014". Archaeologia Cantiana 137, 251–280.

References

Living people
American women academics
1983 births
Fellows of the Society of Antiquaries of London
Women classical scholars
Women archaeologists
21st-century American women